Old Guard or The Old Guard may refer to:

Old Guard (France), units of the French Imperial Guard under Napoleon Bonaparte
Old Guard (Australia), a right wing organisation of the 1920s and 1930s
Old Guard (New York), a ceremonial battalion of New York City infantry veterans, founded 1826
Old Guards (Russia), the collective term for military units serving as personal guards of the Emperor of Russia
Bolshevik old guard
Old Guard faction, an organized grouping in the Socialist Party of America in the early 1930s, which left in 1936 to establish the Social Democratic Federation
The Old Guard (magazine), an American magazine published from 1863 to 1867
Nickname of the 3rd U.S. Infantry Regiment and its
Old Guard Fife and Drum Corps
Old Guard, a segment of the leather subculture

Film 
The Old Guard (franchise), film and graphic novel franchise
The Old Guard (2020 film), an American action film
The Old Guard 2, American action film
The Old Guard (1934 film), an Italian film directed by Alessandro Blasetti
The Old Guard (1960 film), French film

See also
Alter Kämpfer